Fidus was the pseudonym used by German illustrator, painter and publisher Hugo Reinhold Karl Johann Höppener (October 8, 1868 – February 23, 1948).  He was a symbolist artist, whose work directly influenced  the psychedelic style of graphic design of the late 1960s.

Biography
Born the son of a confectioner in Lübeck, Höppener demonstrated artistic talent at an early age. Around 1886 he met the "apostle of nature" and artist Karl Wilhelm Diefenbach (1851–1913), and joined Diefenbach's commune near Munich.  On Diefenbach's behalf, he served a brief prison sentence for public nudity, earning him the name Fidus ("faithful").

In 1892 he moved to Berlin, set up another commune, and worked as an illustrator on the magazine Sphinx.  His work appeared frequently in Jugend and other illustrated magazines. He created many ornamental drawings, especially for book decoration, as well as ex-libris, posters and designs. He was one of the first artists to use advertising postcards to promote his work. He also contributed to the early homosexual magazine Der Eigene, published by Adolf Brand.

He held mystical Theosophical beliefs, and became interested in German mythology. His early illustrations contained dream-like abstractions, while his later work was characterised by motifs such as peasants, warriors, and other naked human figures in natural settings. He often combined mysticism, eroticism, and symbolism, in Art Nouveau and Sezessionist styles. By 1900 he was one of the best known painters in Germany, and had come under the influence of writers such as Arthur Moeller van den Bruck, Heinrich and Julius Hart, and the anti-materialist garden city and Wandervogel movements. His most famous painting is Light Prayer, which he made in eleven versions from 1890 to 1938. In 1912 he designed a famous poster for a congress on "biological hygiene" in Hamburg, showing a man in the process of breaking his bonds and rising up to the stars.

After 1918, interest in Fidus' work as an illustrator ebbed. Despite his enthusiasm for the ideology of the Nazi Party, of which he became a member in 1932, he did not receive the support of the Nazi regime. In 1937 his work was seized and the sale of his images was forbidden.  By the time he died in 1948 in Woltersdorf his art had been almost forgotten. It was rediscovered in the 1960s, and directly influenced the psychedelic concert posters which began to be produced at that time, initially in and around San Francisco.

There is an archive of Fidus work at the Berlinische Galerie. Another large archive of Fidus materials (including artworks, diaries, correspondence, and photographs) is held by the Jack Daulton Collection in Los Altos Hills, California.

References

External links

Fidus-Museum, scanned historic publications about and by Fidus.
 Article with several images of Fidus' work
Fidushaus is a Jugendstil, Art Nouveau website featuring works by Fidus.

19th-century German painters
19th-century German male artists
German male painters
German illustrators
German Symbolist painters
German Youth Movement
1868 births
1948 deaths
Art Nouveau painters
Art Nouveau illustrators
Artists from Lübeck
20th-century German painters
20th-century German male artists
German modern pagans
Modern pagan artists
Adherents of Germanic neopaganism